C. xanthogramma may refer to:

Carrhotus xanthogramma, a spider species
Choreutis xanthogramma, a moth species